Wynnum North railway station is located on the Cleveland line in Queensland, Australia. It is one of three stations serving the Brisbane suburb of Wynnum; the other two stations are Wynnum and Wynnum Central.

Services
Wynnum North is served by Cleveland line services from Shorncliffe, Northgate, Doomben and Bowen Hills to Manly & Cleveland.

Services by platform

References

External links

Wynnum North station Queensland's Railways on the Internet
[ Wynnum North station] TransLink travel information

Railway stations in Brisbane
Wynnum, Queensland